Federico Bonazzoli (born 21 May 1997) is an Italian professional footballer who plays as a striker for Salernitana.

Club career

Inter Milan
Bonazzoli played at youth level for Ghedi and Montechiari, before joining Inter Milan at the age of seven.

On 18 May 2014, Bonazzoli made his senior debut against Chievo Verona as a substitute for Rubén Botta in the 85th minute of a 1–2 away defeat on the last day of the Serie A season. He became the second youngest footballer to play in Serie A for Inter aged 16 years, 11 months and 27 days, 17 days older than Massimo Pellegrini, who debuted in 1982. On 6 November 2014 he made his UEFA Europa League debut in a 1–1 away draw against Saint-Étienne in the group stage, he was replaced by Joel Obi in the 66th minute.

Sampdoria
On 2 February 2015, he signed for fellow league team Sampdoria for €4.5 million, but would remain at Inter on loan until the end of the season.

On 21 January 2016, he was signed by Serie B club Lanciano on a season-long loan deal, with an option to purchase. On 22 July, he joined Brescia on loan.

Loan to Torino
On 5 October 2020, Bonazzoli joined Torino on loan.

Loan to Salernitana 
On 3 August 2021, US Salernitana announced the signing of Bonazzoli on a season-long loan with an option to buy. He scored two goals in his Coppa Italia debut win over Reggina.

Salernitana 
On 26 July 2022, Bonazzoli signed permanently with Salernitana on a four year contract, for a reported fee of €5 millions.

International career
With the Italy U-17 side he took part at the 2013 UEFA European Under-17 Championship.

He made his debut with the Italy U-21 team on 17 November 2014, in a home friendly match loss 1–0 against Denmark, becoming the youngest player to make his debut with the team at the time.

Style of play
Bonazzoli models himself on former Inter forward Zlatan Ibrahimović. He is highly rated by Inter fans as a Christian Vieri-like striker, with a great physique and technical abilities.

Career statistics

Club

References

Living people
1997 births
Sportspeople from the Province of Brescia
Footballers from Lombardy
Association football forwards
Italian footballers
Inter Milan players
U.C. Sampdoria players
S.S. Virtus Lanciano 1924 players
Brescia Calcio players
S.P.A.L. players
Calcio Padova players
Torino F.C. players
U.S. Salernitana 1919 players
Serie A players
Serie B players
Italy youth international footballers
Italy under-21 international footballers